Ilmatar (minor planet designation: 385 Ilmatar) is a large Main Belt asteroid.

It was discovered by Max Wolf on March 1, 1894, in Heidelberg. It was  named after Ilmatar, virgin spirit of the air. Its mass is unknown. Its rotation is 62.35 hr.

References

External links
 
 

Background asteroids
Ilmatar
Ilmatar
S-type asteroids (Tholen)
18940301